Two ships of the United States Navy have been named Bennington, after the town of Bennington, Vermont. The Battle of Bennington occurred on 16 August 1777.

 , was commissioned in 1891 and took possession of Wake Island during the Spanish–American War.
 , was an aircraft carrier of World War II and decommissioned in 1970.

References

United States Navy ship names
Bennington, Vermont